Tajan Lateh-ye Olya (also Romanized as Tajan Lateh-ye ‘Olyā) is a village in Gahrbaran-e Shomali Rural District, Gahrbaran District, Miandorud County, Mazandaran Province, Iran. At the 2006 census, its population was 262, in 66 families.

References 

Populated places in Miandorud County